Falah Hassan al-Naqib is an Iraqi politician and was the Minister of Interior under the Iraqi Interim Government.

Biography
Born in 1956 in Samarra, he is a Sunni Arab. He trained in the United States as a civil engineer. His father, General Hassan al-Naqib, defected in the 1970s and became an active opposition member in exile.

An ally of Interim Prime Minister Iyad Allawi, he was named the governor of Salah ad Din Governorate after the fall of Saddam Hussein, then he became the Minister of Interior, from 2004 to 2005.

References

1956 births
Living people
People from Samarra
Members of the Council of Representatives of Iraq
Interior ministers of Iraq